The Badminton women's team event at the 1998 Asian Games was scheduled from 8th - 11 December 1998 at Thamassat University Sports Complex, Bangkok, Thailand.

Schedule
All times are Indochina Time (UTC+07:00)

Results

Quarterfinals

Semifinals

Final

References
Results

External links
Results

Women's team